A. acaulis may refer to:

An abbreviation of a species name. In binomial nomenclature the name of a species is always the name of the genus to which the species belongs, followed by the species name (also called the species epithet). In A. acaulis the genus name has been abbreviated to A. and the species has been spelled out in full. In a document that uses this abbreviation it should always be clear from the context which genus name has been abbreviated.

Some of the most common uses of A. acaulis are:
 Abolboda acaulis, a flowering plant endemic to South America
 Aiphanes acaulis, a spiny palm
 Aletes acaulis, a plant endemic to North America
 Alsophila acaulis, a tree fern
 Anisocoma acaulis, a wildflower
 Arctotis acaulis, a flowering plant native to Africa
 Arnica acaulis, a sunflower
 Asphodelus acaulis, a garden plant